This article presents the results of the 2011 Abierto Mexicano Telcel – Women's Singles of the international game of tennis. 

Gisela Dulko won, defeating Arantxa Parra Santonja in the final, 6–3, 7–6(7–5).

Venus Williams was the defending champion but chose not to participate that year.

Seeds

Qualifying

Main draw

Finals

Top half

Bottom half

External links
 WTA tournament draws

Abierto Mexicano Telcel - Women's Singles
2011 Abierto Mexicano Telcel